Lake Fuschl is a lake in the Salzkammergut, Austria, located in the state of Salzburg.

See also
Fuschl am See

References

External links

Lakes of Salzburg (state)